Baird-Parker agar is a type of agar used for the selective isolation of gram-negative  Staphylococci species. It contains lithium chloride and tellurite to inhibit the growth of alternative microbial flora, while the included pyruvate and glycine promote the growth of Staphylococci. Staphylococcus colonies show up black in colour with clear zones produced around them.

History 
Baird-Parker firstly publish an academic article about this agar medium for the purpose of improved diagnostic and isolating coagulase-positive Staphylococci in 1962. He developed this agar medium from the tellurite-glycine formulation of Zebovitz et al and improved its reliability in isolating coagulase-positive staphylococci from foods. Baird-Parker added egg yolk emulsion as a diagnostic agent and sodium pyruvate to protect damaged cells and aid their recovery. It is now widely recommended by national and international bodies for the isolation of coagulase-positive staphylococci. Braid-Parker agar is commonly use as a method for the enumeration of coagulase-positive staphylococci (Staphylococcus aureus and other species) in food and animal feeding stuffs.

Preparation and Formulae 
The following is a method for the preparation of 1 litre of Baird-Parker agar according to ISO 11133:2014 and ISO 6888-1:1999.

 Measure the following. These are the base of Baird-Parker agar.
 10 gram of pancreatic digest of casein
 5 gram of meat extract
 1 gram of yeast extract
 10 gram of sodium pyruvate
 12 gram of L-glycine
 5 gram of lithium chloride
 20 gram of agar
 Suspend 63g of Baird-Parker Agar (ISO) Base in 1,000ml of distilled water.
 Adust the pH into 7.2 ± 0.2 at 25°C.
 Boil to dissolve the medium and sterilise by autoclaving at 121°C for 15 minutes.
 Cool to 47°C and aseptically add 50ml of Egg Yolk Tellurite Emulsion (SR0054). Mix well and pour into sterile Petri dishes.
Dehydrated medium should be stored on 10-30°C. The prepared medium is best used freshly prepared. Dehydrated culture medium has straw coloured and free-flowing powder. Prepared medium has cream or yellow color, opaque gel.

References

Microbiology